Weapons of Mass Destruction is the fifth studio album by American rapper Xzibit. It was released on December 14, 2004, by Open Bar Entertainment, Columbia Records and Sony BMG.

Reception

Commercial
The album debuted at number 43 on the Billboard 200 with approximately 81,000 copies sold in the first week released. The album has sold approximately 283,000 copies as of October 2006  according to Nielsen Soundscan.

On February 2, 2005, the album was certified Gold by the RIAA for sales of over 500,000 copies.

Track listing 
Credits adapted from the album's liner notes.

Notes
"L.A.X." was used in the soundtrack for the game Need for Speed: Underground 2.
"Klack" was used in the soundtrack for the game Juiced.
"Muthafucka" was used in Tony Scott's 2005 film Domino and an edited version called "Mother Mother" was used in the game Def Jam: Fight for NY.
"Hey Now (Mean Muggin) " was used in the soundtrack for the game  NFL Street 2

Sample credits
 "Judgement Day" contains samples from "It Can't Make Any Difference To Me", written by Lane Tietgen, as performed by Dave Mason.
 "Criminal Set" contains samples from "Amerikkka's Most Wanted", written by O'Shea Jackson, Eric Sadler, and Keith Shocklee, as performed by Ice Cube.
 "Klack" contains interpolations from "Keeps Me Satisfied", written by Richard Tufo.
 "Back 2 the Way It Was" contains excerpts from "Changin'", written by Lynn Mack, James McClellan, and Jerry Peters, as performed by Sharon Ridley. It also contains interpolations from "Turn to Stone", written by Joe Walsh and Terry Trabandt.

Charts

Certifications

References

External links
 

2004 albums
Xzibit albums
Columbia Records albums
Albums produced by Danja (record producer)
Albums produced by Timbaland
Albums produced by Rick Rock
Albums produced by Hi-Tek
Albums produced by DJ Khalil
Albums produced by Battlecat (producer)